Tråante 2017 was a celebration marking the centennial of the Sámi Assembly of 1917, which opened on 6 February 1917 in Trondheim, Norway. Trondheim is called "Tråante" in Southern Sámi.

The celebration started with a week-long anniversary celebration beginning on the Sámi National Day, 6 February 2017, in Trondheim, followed by additional cultural, sporting, religious, educational, research, industry, natural, and political events throughout the year. In addition to marking the 100th anniversary of the Sámi Assembly, Tråante 2017 served to disseminate knowledge about the Sámi people, their culture, and history across Norway, Sweden, Finland, and Russia.

Tråante 2017 was organized by the Sámediggi and the governments of Sør-Trøndelag county, Nord-Trøndelag county, and Trondheim municipality. Project manager for Tråante 2017 was Sámi politician .

Activities 
The NTNU Science Museum opened its exhibit "Hvem eier historien?" (Who owns the story?) on 5 February 2017. The exhibition documents the Sámi presence in southern Norway dating back to the 800s.

In connection with the 100th anniversary, Norges Bank issued a  coin with a Sami motif designed by artist Annelise Josefsen.

Posten Norge issued two stamps, designed by artist Astrid Båhl, who also designed the Sámi flag, to mark the 100th anniversary. The motifs on the stamps were the Sami Parliament building, the Sami flag, and a portrait of Sámi activist Elsa Laula Renberg.

On Sámi National Day, February 6, 2017, a Sámi altar was inaugurated in Nidaros Cathedral in Trondheim. The altar was designed by the artist  and is made of oiled birch and adorned with Sámi ornaments.

References

External links 

 
 Forbereder samisk byfest  (Adresseavisen)

2017 in Norway
Sámi culture
Culture in Trondheim
Sámi people
2010s in Norway